Asculum, also known as Ausculum, was the ancient name of two Italian cities.

The first is Ascoli Piceno, the Ausculum in ancient Picenum (modern Marche).   It is situated in the valley of the Truentus (mod. Tronto) river on the via Salaria.  It was originally a Sabine city (Festus 235.16-17).  Following its defeat by the Romans in 268 BC (Eutr. 2,16), Asculum became a civitas foederata.  It was the first Italian city to rise up against Rome in 90 BC during the Social War. An account described the city as home to a war-like people that bore generation-old grudge against Rome for encroaching on its northern territories. It was besieged and captured following the Battle of Asculum (89 BC). Discovered artifacts in the city such as sling bullets show that the siege included at least four Roman legions as well as Gallic and Spanish auxiliaries. Following the war, it became a municipium. In the triumviral period or under Augustus, it became a colonia.

The second city is Ascoli Satriano, a small village of the Satriani people, on a branch of the Appian Way in Apulia, South East Italy. Two battles were fought there. The first was the Battle of Asculum (279 BC), which was the first of King Pyrrhus of Epirus's Pyrrhic victory against the Roman Republic during the Pyrrhic War. This was followed by the Battle of Asculum (209 BC), during the Second Punic War, in which Hannibal defeated a Roman army commanded by Marcus Claudius Marcellus in an indecisive battle.

Notes

Roman sites of the Marche
Ascoli Piceno
Picenum